Iran's forests are part of Iran's natural resources. Most of the country's forests are located in the northern regions, on the southern shores of the Caspian Sea. These forests have a temperate humid climate and are extended from the east of Ardabil province to North Khorasan province. They also spread and cover the three provinces of Gilan, Mazandaran, and Golestan. The Alborz mountain range, which is the highest mountain range in the Middle East, stands like a wall against the moisture of the Caspian Sea and prevents the moisture coming into the central regions of Iran; therefore, these clouds are forced to rain in the northern areas of the country leaving the central areas dry and barren.

There are 3,400,000 hectares of forests on the northern slopes of the Alborz Mountains and the coastal provinces of the Caspian Sea. Other parts of the country have forests up to three million hectares. Of these forests, only 1.3 million hectares can be used for industrial exploitation, the rest of the forests are not exploited due to lack of proper maintenance or natural damage. According to the records, Iran had many and varied forests from ancient times to the beginning of the eighteenth century. During the Achaemenid period, the expanse of forests in Iran with the current borders reached more than 16 million hectares. Deforestation in Iran began after the Mongol invasion and reached its highest point in the last three centuries. During the Qajar dynasty, about 130,000 tons of charcoal were produced and exported abroad by cutting down the forest trees.

Nationalization of forests and fields 
The government’s program included the nationalization of the forests, fields, waters, and natural resources. 

On January 26, 1963, forests were declared national according to the framework of the White Revolution. In accordance with the second principle of the White Revolution, about 120 million hectares of forests and fields which were also known as green gold mines, were given to the government for national exploitation.

Trees and soil erosion 

Trees, shrubs, and vegetation in general have an effective role in maintaining the stability of the soil and increasing their permeability. The surface soil that can be used by humans is not more than a few centimetres, so its preservation is vital. In barren areas, wind erosion is the main cause of soil degradation and in windy areas, trees are an effective factor in soil stabilization.

The climate in the forests 
Some forests (for example, evergreen forests) are less affected by climate change; But others (for example, temperate deciduous forests) are severely affected, losing all their leaves each fall. 

The growth of the trees in the forests depends on several factors, mainly sunlight, type of soil and water, temperature, and the genetic potential of trees. Most of these factors are directly or indirectly related to the weather

In summer, the temperature inside the forest is usually between 6-8 degrees Fahrenheit (3-4 degrees Celsius) lower than the temperature outside the forest, but in winter the temperature in the forest is very close to the outdoor temperature and sometimes a few degrees warmer. The outdoor soil temperature on a summer day may reach to 90 degrees Fahrenheit (32 degrees Celsius), while soil temperature in a nearby forest lines to 20 degrees Fahrenheit (11 degrees Celsius).

During winter, in a coniferous forest, because of insulation such as sunshade and litter on the forest floor, the forest soil freezes and in spring, the soil warms up.

Forest regions of Iran 
Iran's forests can be divided into five vegetation regions:

1.  Hyrcanian region (Caspian) which forms the green belt of the north side of the country.

2.  The region of Iran and Turan, which are mainly scattered in the center of Iran.

3.  Zagros region, which mainly contains oak forests in the west of the country.

4.  The Persian Gulf region, which is scattered in the southern coastal belt.

5. Arasbarani region, which contains rare and unique species.

Iran’s forests are classified in five regions and the country ranks 45th among 56 countries with forests in the world.

Caspian Sea Region 
The forests in the north part of the country, which are known as the forests of the Hyrcanian or Caspian vegetation zone, wet forests, and industrial forests of the north,  such as the green strip of the southern Caspian Sea and the northern profile of the Alborz mountain range from Astara to Glidaghi, approximately 800 km long, 20 to 70 Km and an altitude of 2,800 meters above sea level.

So far, 80 species of trees (mainly broadleaf), four species of native conifers, and 50 species of shrubs have been identified in these forests, most of which are mixed species of beech, hornbeam, oak, maple, and alder. 

These forests are remnants of the third geological period. But the reason for the scarcity of conifers in the Hyrcanian forests is the lack of progress and expansion of glaciers in the late third and early fourth geological period in these areas.  

This area in the north is the green belt of the country in Gilan, Mazandaran, and Golestan. The Hyrcanian region has a humid climate and is affected by the Caspian Sea.

References 

Forests of Iran
Alborz (mountain range)
Ecoregions of Iran
Masally District
Geography of Gilan Province
Geography of Golestan Province
Geography of Mazandaran Province
World Heritage Sites in Iran